Dr. Manuel Fernando Alsina Capó was a prominent Spanish-Puerto Rican urologist/surgeon who was one of the founders of the Partido Nuevo Progresista (New Progressive Party) in 1967 and performed the first kidney transplant in Puerto Rico in the 1968.

Early years
Born on February 11, 1909, in Barcelona, Spain (other sources claim 1914 in Venezuela and 1919 in Puerto Rico), young Manuel Fernando traveled extensively with his progenitors Manuel Alsina Montes and Rafaela Capó, accompanied by his aunt Mercedes Alsina and uncle José "Pepe" Girones, all of whom came from Barcelona to the New World at some point in the early 1900s, subsequently settling in Maracaibo, Venezuela where Manuel Fernando, if not born there, did attend a German military academy from kindergarten until his graduation with high honors at age 17. His father also had established a shoe factory and related leather goods manufacturing and export venues in this city.

Upon realising that his son was fit to study medicine, and being that he was the only offspring he had, Manuel Fernando Alsina, Sr. and the family decided to sell their booming businesses in Venezuela and once again migrated, this time to the United States where, as hoped, Manuel Fernando was promptly welcomed and admitted to the Villanova School of Medicine.

Personal life
After graduation with Magna Cum Laude honors, Dr. Manuel Fernando Alsina Capó married Rosa Látimer, a woman of Corsican descent. The couple settled in Puerto Rico immediately following World War II. The entire family, along with parents and uncles and other relatives, quickly established themselves there and it was not long before they once again became well known in business, social, and political circles. The marriage of young Manuel and Rosa did not last, however, and not long after their fourth child, Maria Celeste Alsina Látimer, was born the couple divorced following a bitter separation. The other older children were Manuel Fernando, José Antonio, and Rosa Gemma.

Manolín, as Dr. Manuel Fernando Alsina Capó was affectionately known to his family and friends, served shortly after in the US Navy Medical Branch as surgeon and for a time was stationed in the Pacific during the Korean War.

Upon his return to civilian life, Dr. Alsina Capó met and married Norma Mercedes González Sapia, daughter of Spanish and Italian immigrants Antonio González and Francesca Sapia Bosch. Antonio González, head of the accounting department of one of Puerto Rico's main sugar mills at the time, was brother of Avelino González, a well-known and beloved local inventor and founder of the highly successful Puerto Rican socialite retreat, the Ponce Yacht and Fishing Club.

Norma's mother, Francesca, was a well-known, cherished, and highly-spirited lady who widowed at an early age but with financial support from her brothers (Washington D.C.-resident U.S. Army General Timothy Sapia Bosch, Banco de Ponce Vice-President Salvatore (a.k.a. Salvador) Sapia Bosch) and a younger sister (Esther Armstrong Sapia) plus her lifelong friends Rosa Serrallés, Ada Valdivieso, and Joaquín Villafañe, as well as the Cortada, Covas, and Vendrell families among others, Francesca, who had become locally known as Francisca and then as Paquita, was able to raise her children (William, Edmée, Norma Mercedes and Jorge Antonio) comfortably amid the difficult and perilous World War II years.

Indeed, Paquita was very glad to have her youngest daughter Norma Mercedes marry Manuel Fernando, despite his being divorced. Elder daughter Edmée had previously married Jaime Vicens, a very successful businessman and brother of the well-known sports figure and idol Pachín Vicens, and of Enrique "Coco" Vicens, well-known doctor and ex-Senator of Puerto Rico. William González Sapia, to his credit, was well respected locally for having been Puerto Rico's top swimmer at one point, having been able in his twenties to swim from one island to another without tiring. He married the beautiful Mercedes Frau, a charming lady from one of Puerto Rico's most prestigious families at the time. Finally, Jorge Antonio, the youngest of the four, graduated from college after serving in the US Army in Washington, D.C., subsequently marrying sweetheart Mercedes Clavell Arias and eventually being named Upjohn Pharmaceutical's European General Manager.

From Dr. Alsina Capó's marriage to Norma Mercedes were born, in this order, Manuel Antonio (a.k.a. Monty, deceased 1986), Fernando Rafael, Elizabeth-Ann and Lee-Ann (twins, the latter of whom died as an infant while still in the hospital), Lila Mercedes and Ángel Eduardo.

Medical profession
Manuel Fernando Alsina Capó co-founded and was President of the Asociación de Urólogos de Puerto Rico in 1957.

Dr. Alsina Capó loved his involvement with social, political and sports causes/ventures and throughout his life dedicated himself to serving and promoting everything from boxing, track and field, swimming, baseball, basketball, sports clubs and national and international sports competitions. Also, as an avid Republican and personal friend of Luis Alberto Ferré Aguayo, Alsina Capó, along with Nelson Escalona and Ferré Aguayo, founded the Partido Nuevo Progresista in 1967, a statehood-oriented political party which in less than a year won the general elections and put its president, Luis Alberto Ferré Aguayo, in the governor's seat for the next four years.

Civil service
Manuel Fernando Alsina Capó also served as President of the Ponce, Puerto Rico, Municipal Assembly for four years while maintaining his medical practice. Some of his house guests included George H. W. Bush.

Final years
Dr. Manuel Fernando Alsina Capó's final years were spent in a nursing home where few people could visit him, eventually dying on February 9, 2008, two days before his next birthday.

References

20th-century births
2008 deaths
People from Barcelona
Puerto Rican people of Catalan descent
New Progressive Party (Puerto Rico) politicians